Bergshamra metro station is a station on the red line of the Stockholm metro, located in Bergshamra, Solna Municipality. The station was opened on 29 January 1978 as part of the extension from Universitetet to Mörby centrum.

References

Red line (Stockholm metro) stations
Railway stations opened in 1978